Tiit Rosenberg (born 26 December 1946, in Tsirguliina) is an Estonian historian and professor of Estonian History in University of Tartu. In 1996–2008 was he also chairman of Õpetatud Eesti Selts (The Learned Estonian Society).

Rosenberg studies history of agriculture in 19th Century and also Estonian historiography.

References

1946 births
Living people
People from Valga Parish
20th-century Estonian historians
Historians of Estonia
Academic staff of the University of Tartu
Recipients of the Order of the White Star, 4th Class
21st-century Estonian historians